The 2015–16 3. Liga was the eighth season of the 3. Liga.

Teams
A total of 20 teams contested the league, including 14 sides from the 2014–15 3. Liga. Arminia Bielefeld and MSV Duisburg were directly promoted to the 2015–16 2. Bundesliga at the end of the 2014–15 season. Bielefeld made an immediate return to the 2. Bundesliga after being relegated in 2013–14. Duisburg returned to the 2. Bundesliga after two seasons in the third tier. The two promoted teams were replaced by FC Erzgebirge Aue and VfR Aalen, who finished in the bottom two places of the 2014–15 2. Bundesliga table.

At the other end of the table, Borussia Dortmund II, SpVgg Unterhaching and SSV Jahn Regensburg were relegated to the 2015–16 Regionalliga. The three relegated teams were replaced by the three winners of the 2014–15 Regionalliga promotion playoffs. SV Werder Bremen II from the Regionalliga Nord returned to the national level after three seasons in the fourth tier, while 1. FC Magdeburg from the Regionalliga Nordost and Würzburger Kickers from the Regionalliga Bayern are playing their debut seasons in the 3. Liga.

A further place in the league was available via a two-legged play-off between third-placed 2014–15 3. Liga team Holstein Kiel and 16th-placed 2014–15 2. Bundesliga side TSV 1860 München. The tie ended 2–1 on aggregate and saw Kiel remaining in the 3. Liga.

Stadiums and locations

Personnel and kits

Managerial changes

League table

Results

Top goalscorers

Number of teams by state

References

External links

3
2015-16
Germ